Wuhaoqu is a township in Yanqi Hui Autonomous County in the Bayin'gholin Mongol Autonomous Prefecture of Xinjiang, in Northwestern China. According to the 2000 Chinese census, the township has a population of 14,791 people and covers 96 square kilometres.

References

External links
Hudong Encyclopedia 

Populated places in Xinjiang
Township-level divisions of Xinjiang
Yanqi Hui Autonomous County